Shannon Kook (born Shannon Xiao Lóng Kook-Chun; 9 February 1987) is a South African actor. He is best known for his roles in the television series Degrassi: The Next Generation (2010–2011), Carmilla (2015–2016), Shadowhunters (2017), and The 100 (2018–2020), as well as his role as Drew Thomas in the film franchise The Conjuring (2013–2021).

Early life
Kook-Chun was born in Johannesburg, South Africa to a Mauritian father of Chinese descent and a South African mother of Cape Coloured descent. He then moved to Montreal in order to attend the National Theatre School of Canada.

Career 
Kook's first on screen role was in the Canadian television series Being Erica in 2009. He is best known internationally for his roles as Zane Park on Degrassi: The Next Generation (2010–2011) and as Duncan on Shadowhunters (2017).

In 2014, Kook, Alexandre Landry, Sophie Desmarais, and Julia Sarah Stone, were chosen for the Toronto International Film Festival's Rising Stars initiative, an annual distinction that spotlights four up and coming Canadian actors to talent developers and filmmakers at the festival.

Between 2015 and 2016, Kook starred in the popular web series Carmilla. In 2017, he was featured in the web series Running With Violet.

In January 2018, it was announced that Kook has been cast as a mysterious new guest star, Lucas, on the fifth season of The CW's The 100. This was revealed to be a red herring by series showrunner Jason Rothenberg. Kook's role was later revealed as Jordan Jasper Green, the son of Monty Green and Harper McIntyre. Kook had originally auditioned for the role of Finn Collins and Monty Green. Kook returned as a series regular in season six and seven.

Filmography

Film

Television

References

External links
 
 

Living people
1987 births
21st-century South African male actors
Coloured South African people
Male actors from Johannesburg
National Theatre School of Canada alumni
South African emigrants to Canada
South African male film actors
South African male television actors
South African people of Chinese descent
South African people of Mauritian descent